Sympistis saundersiana, known generally as the Saunders' sympistis or Saunders' sallow moth, is a species of moth in the family Noctuidae (the owlet moths).

The MONA or Hodges number for Sympistis saundersiana is 10099.

References

Further reading

 
 
 

saundersiana
Articles created by Qbugbot
Moths described in 1876